Garza-Salinas II is a census-designated place (CDP) in Starr County, Texas, United States. It is a new CDP formed from part of the La Puerta CDP prior to the 2010 census with a population of 719.

Geography
Garza-Salinas II is located at  (26.351774, -98.759539).

Education
It is in the Rio Grande City Grulla Independent School District (formerly Rio Grande City Consolidated Independent School District)

References

Census-designated places in Starr County, Texas
Census-designated places in Texas